Eastry railway station was a railway station on the East Kent Light Railway. It opened on 16 October 1916 and closed to passenger traffic after the last train on 30 October 1948. It was the station before the Richborough Branch diverged from the main line to Wingham. The station served the village of Eastry, it had a passing loop, but this had been converted to a siding in 1948. The track was removed in May 1954. There is no trace of the station today as the area has been landscaped into fields.

References

Sources
 

Disused railway stations in Kent
Former East Kent Light Railway stations
Railway stations in Great Britain opened in 1916
Railway stations in Great Britain closed in 1948
1916 establishments in England
1948 disestablishments in England